Suangdoh is a mid-sized village situated in Suangdoh Sub-Division/TD Block, Churachandpur district, Manipur, Northeast India. It is located within what is known as the Guite Kual. Most of the villages in this area are headed by a Chief of the Guite clan.

Political History 
Suangdoh has always been under Guite rule. Among the Guites, the Suangdoh Chiefs are descendants of Thangpau, the third son of Inpipa Pu Vummang. Inpipa Pu Vummang is the 17th direct descendant of Pu Guite. From his capital city of choice, present-day Teddim, Pu Vummang ruled over 70 villages who paid him taxes.

Location 
The village was originally located on a hilltop 30 or 40 kilometers from Singngat. To the east lies Singngat, to the southeast lies the famous Tuivel River and distant neighboring villages such as Mualzin, Tuiman, Maukot, C.Tuiveljang, Mongken, Doupau, Chiangpi, Tuilakjang, Lungthul (T), Enpum and Lungchin, and to the west lies the hill range of Lungthul. In the early 1990s, the then Chief Mr Khamchinpau Guite decided to move the village to a place originally known as Hiangtui, as the “new” Guite Road could not pass through Suangdoh as it was situated on a hilltop. Thus, the village is now situated about 5 km from its original location, on a low-lying flat top. This new Suangdoh is now roughly 35 kilometers from the nearest Tehsil, Singngat, 60 km from Churachandpur, and 89 km from Imphal. Today, the village has over 200 households, a PHSC/ Health & Wellness Centre, a Government High School and a Church-run Junior High School called Kaikhoen Academy. It is approximately 2 km long.

Nearby villages include Tuiveljang, Maukot, Mongken, Doupau, Chiangpi, Tuilaakjang, Lungthul(T), Lungthul(E), Lungchin, etc.  The rivers Tuivel, Tuilak, Tuivai, Zaupilui, Govomlui, and  flows in and around Suangdoh.

Tuiveljang, Tuilakjang, Doupau and Chiangpi were curved out of Suangdoh land, in other words, they are Machets.

People 
The total population of Suangdoh at the 2001 census was 1337, with a male population of 663 and a female population of 674.  Their main occupation has shifted from jhuming cultivation to other farming professions. Suangdoh is about 60 kilometers from Lamka and vehicles go to the village almost every day.

References 

Churachandpur
Cities and towns in Churachandpur district